Facundo Nicolás Boné Vale (born 16 November 1995) is a Uruguayan footballer who currently plays for River Plate.

Club career
Boné started his career playing with Fénix in the Uruguayan Primera División in 2013.

International career
Boné represented the Uruguay national under-20 football team at the 2015 South American Youth Championship and in the pre-squad for the 2015 FIFA U-20 World Cup.

References

External links
 

1995 births
Living people
Uruguayan footballers
Uruguayan expatriate footballers
People from Colonia Department
Association football midfielders
Uruguay under-20 international footballers
Uruguayan Primera División players
Campeonato Brasileiro Série B players
Club Atlético River Plate (Montevideo) players
Centro Atlético Fénix players
Vila Nova Futebol Clube players
Uruguayan expatriate sportspeople in Brazil
Expatriate footballers in Brazil